Ionithermie is a service offered in some spas that involves the application of electric stimulation followed by different topical applications that vary depending on the practitioner.  Ionithermie originated in France. It was invented by Olivier Fouche in 1979 and then launched in the UK in 1983.  With claims to reduce "toxic waste" in the body, ionithermie is a form of pseudoscientific detoxification.  There is no clinical evidence supporting its effectiveness.

References

External links
 

Alternative detoxification